The 2017 Invictus Games was a parasport event for wounded, injured or sick armed services personnel and their associated veterans, which was held in Toronto, Ontario, Canada. The third Invictus Games, an  event created in 2014 by Prince Harry, included eleven sports. It was the second Games to be held in North America, following the Invictus Games Orlando 2016.

Development and preparation
The CEO of the 2017 Invictus Games was Michael Burns.

Torch relay

The relay took place between 19 August and 26 September, visiting all 32 Canadian Forces bases and neighbouring communities, being carried by over 1000 torchbearers. The route was charted as being 7000 kilometres long.

Venues
The Games used some of the facilities from Pan American and Parapan American Games in 2015, held in Toronto.

There was no athlete's village for these games, but the downtown Sheraton Centre Toronto Hotel became an unofficial village for participants living there.

Funding
The Royal Canadian Legion was asked by organizers to be a sponsor; the 30 members of the Legion council who met voted unanimously in support. Their $500,000 donation drew criticism from Canadian Veterans Advocacy, who suggested that drawing on the Poppy Campaign donations as opposed to other revenue sources was inappropriate. The Legion and columnists defended the use of funds as supporting the mission, noting other veteran welfare projects like purchasing a specialized MRI for a mental health clinic.

Marketing

A dog named Vimy was announced as the Games' mascot in April 2015. It was named for the Battle of Vimy Ridge, considered by many as a defining moment in Canadian history. A few days later, Prince Harry attended an exhibition sledge hockey game at Mattamy Athletic Centre in Toronto, alongside Prime Minister Justin Trudeau and Toronto Mayor John Tory, as part of a series of launch events at the Royal York Hotel, and with Elizabeth Dowdeswell in the office of the Lieutenant Governor of Ontario, at the Legislative Assembly of Ontario, Queen's Park.

The Games

Participating nations
All 15 countries from the 2016 Games were invited again, while Romania and Ukraine made their debut.

Sports

 Archery
 Athletics
 Golf
 Indoor rowing
 Powerlifting
 Road cycling
 Sitting volleyball
 Sledge hockey
 Swimming
 Wheelchair basketball
 Wheelchair rugby

Calendar
Source:

Medal table

Broadcasters
Bell Media was announced as the exclusive broadcast partner of the Games, in a deal covering both the Orlando 2016 and Toronto 2017 events. Events were shown on TSN. The station helped run the Toronto launch ceremony in May 2016.

References

2017 in Canadian sports
2017 in multi-sport events
Invictus Games
International sports competitions in Toronto
2017 in Toronto
Multi-sport events in Canada
Invictus Games